9020 may refer to:

In general
 9020 BCE, a year in the 10th millennium BC
 9020 CE, a year in the 10th millennium
 9020, a number in the 9000 (number) range

Places
 9020 Eucryphia, an asteroid in the Asteroid Belt, the 9020th asteroid registered
 Vermont Route 9020. a state highway
 Telephone exchange 9020, a local exchange in New Zealand; see List of dialling codes in New Zealand

Products
 CP Class 9020, a diesel locomotive train class
 HP 9020, a computer workstation in the HP 9000 series
 IBM 9020, a mainframe computer model used for air traffic control
 John Deere 9020, a tractor series; see List of John Deere tractors
 Kintetsu 9020 series, an electric multiple unit train series
 Tokyu 9020 series, an electrical multiple unit train series

Other uses
 East Japan Railway Company (stock ticker: 9020)

See also